Pavel Valden (3 August 1887 – 28 September 1948) was a Russian Empire sports shooter. He competed in five events at the 1912 Summer Olympics.

References

1887 births
1948 deaths
Male sport shooters from the Russian Empire
Olympic competitors for the Russian Empire
Shooters at the 1912 Summer Olympics
Sportspeople from Ulyanovsk